Jamalpur Mahavidyalaya, established in 2009, is an undergraduate general and honours degree college in Jamalpur in Purba Bardhaman district. It offers undergraduate courses in arts. It is affiliated to  University of Burdwan.

Departments

Arts
 Bengali
English
History
Philosophy
Political Science
Sanskrit

See also

References

External links
 http://www.jamalpurmahavidyalaya.net

Colleges affiliated to University of Burdwan
Educational institutions established in 2009
Universities and colleges in Purba Bardhaman district
2009 establishments in West Bengal